Radek Szmek (born 13 August 1986) is a football player from the Czech Republic. He belongs to the Polish minority in the Czech Republic.

Szmek played most of his career for the Second League side Třinec where he emerged as a product of the youth teams before moving on loan to Frýdek-Místek in 2008. In 2010, he went on loan to Czech First League side 1. FC Slovácko who bought him at the end of his loan spell. The tall striker has since returned to Třinec on loan.

References

External links
 
 Profile at 1. FC Slovácko website

Czech footballers
1986 births
Living people
1. FC Slovácko players
Polish people from Zaolzie
Association football forwards
FK Fotbal Třinec players
FK Frýdek-Místek players
Czech First League players
Czech National Football League players